Georgios Papapetrou (alternate spelling: Giorgos) (Greek: Γιώργος Παπαπέτρου; born November 23, 1991 in Athens, Greece) is a Greek professional basketball player.

College career
Papapetrou played college basketball at Ranger College, and at Franklin Pierce University.

Professional career
In 2014, Papapetrou began his professional career with the Greek League club Koroivos Amaliadas. In 2015, he moved to Promitheas Patras. He then played with Ikaros Kallitheas, Ethnikos Piraeus and Papagou.

Personal
Papapetrou's father, Argyris Papapetrou, was also a professional basketball player in Greece. His mother, Anastasia, played football in Greece. While his younger brother, Ioannis Papapetrou, is also a professional basketball player.

References

External links
FIBA.com Profile
FIBA Europe Profile
Eurobasket.com Profile
Draftexpress.com Profile
RealGM.com Profile
Greek Basket League Profile 
Franklin Pierce University Profile

1991 births
Living people
Ethnikos Piraeus B.C. players
Franklin Pierce Ravens men's basketball players
Greek Basket League players
Greek expatriate basketball people in the United States
Greek men's basketball players
Ikaros B.C. players
Koroivos B.C. players
Papagou B.C. players
Point guards
Promitheas Patras B.C. players
Ranger Rangers men's basketball players
Basketball players from Athens